Gere Kavanaugh (born 1929) is an American textile, industrial, and interior designer. She is the principal of Gere Kavanaugh Designs.

Early life and education
Gere Kavanaugh was born in 1929 and grew up in Memphis, Tennessee. She earned a BFA from the Memphis Academy of Art and was the third woman to receive a MFA degree from Michigan's Cranbrook Academy of Art.

Career
Kavanaugh worked as a stylist for General Motors primarily designing exhibitions to showcase automobiles, but also displays, created model kitchens, and interiors. She was part of the first group of women designers at GM, dubbed the "Damsels of Design" by design director Harley Earl. Her design team at GM was noted to have created the set for the 1958 Feminine automotive show. Using net-like material to create three cages filled with live canaries, who sang when the lights were on, she also created a centerpiece in the middle which resembled a dress. Colored cellophane beneathe the cages floors enhanced the dream-like atmosphere with reflections of rainbows on the floor. Completing the set were chiffon panels and white hyacinths. Kavanaugh advocated the use diversity and the importance of form's relationship to function(Smith, Constance A. Damsels In Design. Schiffer PA Feb 2018). In 1960, she left GM for a position in the Detroit offices of architect Victor Gruen, known as the father of the shopping mall. There, she designed interiors of retail stores and shopping centers across the country. The firm later moved to Los Angeles where she became friends with Frank Gehry. She later shared studio space with Gehry, Don Chadwick, and Deborah Sussman where she founded Gere Kavanaugh/Designs (GK/D) in 1964.

Over the years, Kavanaugh has designed ceramics, light fixtures, homes, store interiors, textiles, town clocks, and furniture. In the 1970s, she worked with furniture company Terra to design the “California umbrella.” Unable to patent the design, she started an alumni product archive at Cranbrook where alums could donate work which companies could reproduce and pay royalties directly to the school.

She was the first interior designer to win a COLA grant from the City of Los Angeles Cultural Affairs Department. Her work was included in the Pacific Standard Time: Art in L.A., 1945-1980 exhibit. Kavanaugh also designed a research room and typeface for the Nixon Presidential Library and Museum.

She was awarded the Julia Morgan Icon Award at the Los Angeles Design Festival in 2014. She also received the American Institute of Graphic Arts (AIGA) Medal in 2016.

Kavanaugh lives in Angelino Heights.

References

External links

Lecture by Kavanaugh at Carnegie Mellon, September 27, 2012.

1929 births
Living people
American furniture designers
American industrial designers
American interior designers
Cranbrook Academy of Art alumni

American textile designers
American women artists
21st-century American women
AIGA medalists